was a Japanese professional golfer.

Kanai was born in Niigata. He won 11 tournaments on the Japan Golf Tour.

Professional wins (20)

Japan Golf Tour wins (11)

*Note: The 1981 Hiroshima Open was shortened to 54 holes due to rain.

Japan Golf Tour playoff record (4–2)

Asia Golf Circuit wins (1)
1986 Cathay Pacific Hong Kong Open

Other wins (3)
this list is probably incomplete
1972 Japan PGA Championship
1975 Nagano Open
1980 Yamanashi Pro-Am

Japan Senior PGA Tour wins (5)
1990 Japan PGA Senior Championship
1991 Japan Senior Open
1992 Japan Senior Open
1993 Japan Senior Open
1998 Japan PGA Senior Championship

Team appearances
World Cup (representing Japan): 1977

See also
List of golfers with most Japan Golf Tour wins

References

External links

Japanese male golfers
Japan Golf Tour golfers
Sportspeople from Niigata Prefecture
1940 births
2022 deaths